The 1977 South American Rugby Championship was the tenth edition of the competition of the leading national Rugby Union teams in South America.

The tournament was played in Tucuman and won by Argentina.

Standings 

{| class="wikitable"
|-
!width=165|Team
!width=40|Played
!width=40|Won
!width=40|Drawn
!width=40|Lost
!width=40|For
!width=40|Against
!width=40|Difference
!width=40|Pts
|- bgcolor=#ccffcc align=center
|align=left| 
|4||4||0||0||250||19||+ 231||8
|- align=center
|align=left| 
|4||3||0||1||84||110||- 26||6
|- align=center
|align=left| 
|4||2||0||2||83||128||+ 7||4
|- align=center
|align=left| 
|4||1||0||3||38||128||- 90||2
|- align=center
|align=left| 
|4||0||0||4||61||183||- 122||0
|}

Results 

First round

Second round

Third round

Fourth round

Fifth round

References

 IRB – South American Championship 1977

1977
1977 rugby union tournaments for national teams
1977 in Argentine rugby union
rugby union
rugby union
rugby union
rugby union
International rugby union competitions hosted by Argentina